This is a list of association football players who have either played at least one first team match or are currently in the 2017-18 first team squad of F.C. Copenhagen.

Key

Players
Up to date as of 29 May 2017.

References
 Player statistics by F.C. Copenhagen

Copenhagen, F.C.
Players
 
F.C. Copenhagen
F.C. Copenhagen
Association football player non-biographical articles